Battle of the Coral Sea is a 1959 war film directed by Paul Wendkos. It stars Cliff Robertson and Gia Scala.

Plot
The crew of an American submarine are on a reconnaissance mission, photographing Japanese installations through a periscope camera.  When attacked by the Japanese (with similarities to ) the submarine is scuttled and the crew is captured.  Tortured by the Japanese, with the help of British and Australian prisoners the submarine's officers make an escape bid to get their information to the Allies.  The film ends with footage of the Battle of the Coral Sea (1942), which according to the film was made possible through the information brought back by the submariners.

Cast
 Cliff Robertson as Lieutenant Commander Jeff Conway
 Gia Scala as Karen Philips
 Teru Shimada as Commander Mori
 Patricia Cutts as Lieutenant Peg Whitcomb
 Gene Blakely as Lieutenant Len Ross
 L. Q. Jones as Yeoman Halliday
 Robin Hughes as Major Jammy Harris
 Tom Laughlin as Ensign Franklin
 George Takei as Japanese Radio Operator (uncredited)

(Cast note: Both lead actresses died of unrelated barbiturate poisonings in the early 1970s.)

Filming locations
Filming started March 1959. Location filming was done on Santa Catalina Island and the Channel Islands off the coast of California.

References

External links
 
 

1959 films
1959 war films
American black-and-white films
Columbia Pictures films
Films set in 1942
Pacific War films
Seafaring films based on actual events
World War II prisoner of war films
World War II submarine films
Films directed by Paul Wendkos
Films scored by Ernest Gold
Films produced by Charles H. Schneer
1950s English-language films